Anastasia (from ) is a feminine given name of Greek origin, derived from the Greek word , meaning "resurrection". It is a popular name in Eastern Europe, particularly in Russia, where it was the most used name for decades until 2008.

Origin 
The name Anastasia originated during the early days of Christianity and was given to many Greek  girls born in December and around Easter.  It was established as the female form of the male name Anastasius (Greek:  Anastasios ), and has the meaning of "she/he of the resurrection".  It is the name of several early saints; including Anastasia of Sirmium, a central saint from the 2nd century who is commemorated during the first Mass on Christmas Dawn each year according to the traditional calendar of the Catholic Church and on December 22 according to the Eastern Orthodox Church. Slavic diminutives  include Nastya, Nastia or Nastja (Serbian, Slovenian) as well as various hypocoristics: Nastenka, Nastyusha, Nastyona, Nastasia, Nastunja.

Popularity 
Anastasia is a very popular name for girls, especially in Europe, where most names have Christian associations. Anastasia was the most popular name for girls for many years in Russia until 2008, when it was surpassed by the name Sophia.  It remains one of the top ten names for Russian girls, as well as for girls in Belarus, Moldova, Serbia, Georgia, and Montenegro.

Given name

 Anastasia (sister of Constantine I) (c. 290 – after 314), half sister of Emperor Constantine I
 Anastasia (wife of Constantine IV) (c. 650 – after 711), Empress consort of Constantine IV of the Byzantine Empire
 Princess Anastasia of Greece and Denmark (1878–1923)
 Anastasia of Kiev (c.1023–1074/1096), Queen consort of Hungary
 Anastasia, Princess of Löwenstein-Wertheim-Rosenberg (born 1944)
 Anastasia Avramidou (born 2000), Greek chess master
 Anastasia Bachynska (born 2003), Ukrainian artistic gymnast
 Anastasia Bitsenko (1875–1938), Russian revolutionary
 Anastasia Gloushkov (born 1985), Israeli Olympic synchronized swimmer
 Anastasia Gorbenko (born 2003), Israeli Youth Olympic champion swimmer
 Anastasia Lapsui (born 1944), Soviet-born Russian Nenets film director, screenwriter, radio journalist
 Anastasia Markovych (died 1729), Ukrainian Hetmana
 Anastasia Melnichenko (born 1984), Ukrainian activist
 Princess Anastasia of Montenegro (1865–1935) was the daughter of King Nikola I Petrović-Njegoš of Montenegro
 Anastasia Motaung, South African politician
 Anastasia Muñoz (born 1984), American voice actress affiliated with Funimation
 Anastasia Ndereba, Kenyan marathon runner
 Anastasia Prikhodko (born 1987), Ukrainian folk rock and traditional pop singer
 Anastasia Radzinskaya (born 2014), Russian Youtuber
 Anastasia Romanova (disambiguation)
 Anastasia Romanovna (1530–1560), Tsarevna of Russia and wife of Tsar Ivan the Terrible
 Grand Duchess Anastasia Nikolaevna of Russia (1901–1918), daughter of Tsar Nicholas II of Russia, of the Romanoff royal family
 Anastasia Soare (born 1957/1958), Romanian-American billionaire businesswoman
 Anastasia Sinitsyna (born 1983), Russian handball player
 Anastasia Skoptsova (born 2000), Russian ice dancer

Fictional characters with the given name
 Princess Anastasia Nikolaevna Romanov, from the 1997 animated film of the same name and based on the real life Grand Duchess Anastasia Nikolaevna of Russia
 Anastasia Tremaine, from the 1950 animated film Cinderella
 Anastasia Hoshin, a character from the light novel/anime series Re:Zero − Starting Life in Another World
 Anastasia Steele, a character from the erotic novel Fifty Shades of Grey

See also 

 Sant'Anastasia
 Saint Anastasia
 Anastasia of Russia (disambiguation)
Anastasia (surname)
Anastacia (given name)
Anastasie
Anastasiia
Anastasija
Anastasiya
Anastassia
Annastasia
Antasia, a genus of moths in the family Geometridae
Anastazia Wambura (born 1965), Tanzanian politician
Albert Anastasia (1902–1957), New York City Cosa Nostra boss and leader of the gang known as Murder, Inc.

Citations

General sources 
 
 
 
 
 
 
 
 

Given names of Greek language origin
Greek feminine given names
Romanian feminine given names
Russian feminine given names
Slavic feminine given names
Ukrainian feminine given names